Metaloricaria paucidens is a species of armored catfish native to French Guiana and Suriname, where it is found in the Oyapock, Sinnamary, and Marowijne River basins.  This species grows to a length of  SL.

References 

 

Harttiini
Taxa named by Isaäc J. H. Isbrücker
Fish described in 1976
Fish of French Guiana
Fish of Suriname